Sabine Gasteiger (born 28 October 1956) is an Austrian Paralympic Gold medallist.
She was awarded a gold medal in 2006, as part of her Decoration of Honour for Services to the Republic of Austria.

Life
Gasteiger was born in 1956. She has very poor eyesight and she therefore competes as a paralympian. She skis for the Austrian national team. 

She won a gold medal, two bronze and a silver at the 2006 Winter Paralympics in Turin. 

She has two silver medals at the 2010 Winter Paralympics in Vancouver. She won the second silver medal in the Women’s Giant Slalom (Visually Impaired). She was the 2009 Austrian disabled sportsperson of the year.

References

Paralympic gold medalists for Austria
Paralympic silver medalists for Austria
Paralympic bronze medalists for Austria
1956 births
Living people
Medalists at the 2006 Winter Paralympics
Austrian female alpine skiers
Medalists at the 2010 Winter Paralympics
Paralympic medalists in alpine skiing
Alpine skiers at the 2006 Winter Paralympics
Alpine skiers at the 2010 Winter Paralympics
Paralympic alpine skiers of Austria
20th-century Austrian women
21st-century Austrian women